Bangabandhu Sheikh Mujibur Rahman Science and Technology University (BSMRSTU) is a public university located in Gopalganj, Bangladesh. It was established in 2011 and named after Bangabandhu Sheikh Mujibur Rahman.  Every year, around 2,750 students enroll in undergraduate programs.

History
Plans for the creation of the university began in 1999. Awami League government took the plan to set up 12 science and technology universities in 12 large districts lacking universities. In the first phase, six development project proposals were prepared. Among the six, BSMRSTU was one of the tops. On 15 November 1999, M. Khairul Alam Khan, Professor of Department of Applied Physics and Electronics Engineering of Rajshahi University was appointed Project Director and sent to Gopalganj.

The Project Director completed the work of university selection, land acquisition (about 55 acres) and land-preparation work. On 8 July 2001, the BSMRSTU Act was enacted. On 13 July, Honorable Prime Minister Sheikh Hasina formally commenced the foundation. On 14 July, Prime Minister Sheikh Hasina recommended that Khan become Vice-Chancellor. The recommendation was approved by the President on 19 July.

In the 2001 election the four-party alliance government of Jamaat-BNP came rose to power and closed the project on 15 April 2002. Khan returned to his previous institution. Seven employees were simply discharged.

Awami League won the ninth parliamentary elections held on 29 December 2008. In November 2009, the project was revived. On 5 January 2010, Hasina reappointed Khan as Project Director. On 14 December 2010, he was appointed Vice-Chancellor for a four-year term. On 2 February 2015. Khondakar Md Nasiruddin, Professor of Biotechnology Department of Bangladesh Agricultural University was appointed as the new Vice-Chancellor by President Abdul Hamid.

Administration

Chancellor
President Abdul Hamid, President of Bangladesh

Vice-Chancellor
M Khairul Alam Khan ( December 2010 - December 2014 )
Khondoker Md. Nasiruddin ( February 2015 – February 2019 )
Khondoker Md. Nasiruddin ( February 2019 – September 2019 )
Md. Shahjahan (In-Charge) ( October 2019 – September 2020 )
A. Q. M. Mahbub ( September 2020 – present )

Faculties and departments
There are 33 departments under 8 faculties.

Faculty of Engineering
Applied Chemistry and Chemical Engineering (ACCE)
Architecture (ARCH)
Civil Engineering (CE)
Computer Science and Engineering (CSE)
Electrical and Electronic Engineering (EEE)
Food and Agroprocess Engineering (FAE)

Faculty of Science
 Mathematics (MAT)
 Statistics (STAT)
 Physics (PHY)
 Chemistry (CHE)
 Environmental Science and Disaster Management (ESDM)

Faculty of Life Science
Biotechnology and Genetic Engineering (BGE)
Biochemistry and Molecular Biology (BMB)
Botany (BOT)
Pharmacy (PHARM)
Psychology (PSY)

Faculty of Arts
English (ENG)
Bangla (BAN)
History (HIS)

Faculty of Social Science
Economics (ECO)
International Relations (IR)
Political Science (PS)
Public Administration (PAD)
Sociology (SOC)

Faculty of Business Studies
Accounting and Information System (AIS)
Finance and Banking (FB)
Management Studies (MS)
Marketing (MKT)
Tourism and Hospitality Management (THM)

Faculty of Law
Law (LAW)

Faculty Of Agriculture 
Agriculture (AGRI)
Fisheries and Marine Bioscience (FMB)
Animal Science and Veterinary Medicine (ASVM)

Academics

Admission and total seats
BSMRSTU enrolls undergraduate, graduate and postgraduate students. Applicants must pass the competitive admission test. Tests are arranged by each faculty under the authority of the admission council. The university enrolls 3070 undergraduates. General seats number 2745. Quota: 8% Foreign:100.

Campus

BSMRSTU has three campuses.

The main campus is situated in Gobra. Sheikh Hasina Agriculture Institute is located in Kusli, Tungipara. The Faculty of Agriculture is at the Kusli campus. The third campus is Sheikh Hasina Institute of ICT and is in Shibchar, Madaripur and hosts the Faculty of Engineering's department: CSE, EEE, ACCE, ETE, FAE and Civil. The main campus consists of five halls for students, the central library, an academic building, and an administrative building.

Library
Ekushee February Library Center is the central library. At present it is two-storied (four-storied building) 1100 sq.m. In the northern part of the campus it is located with beautiful design. It was inaugurated on 21 February 2014. Its construction cost is 2 crore 46 lakh 74 thousand taka. It has a collection of books, journals and newspapers. The library is open during academic hours (Generally from 9:00 A.M to 8:00 P.M)

Residential student halls
Campus hosts five residential halls, each of which has five-stories with a capacity of 250 students. The halls are:

For Boys -
Bijoy Debash Hall
Swadhinata Debash Hall
Sheikh Rasel Hall

For Girls -
Bangamata Sheikh Fazilatunnesa Mujib Hall
Sheikh Rehana Hall

References

Public universities of Bangladesh
Universities of science and technology in Bangladesh
Memorials to Sheikh Mujibur Rahman
Universities and colleges in Gopalganj District, Bangladesh